Galen is an almost exclusively masculine given name. The best-known Galen was a Greek physician, surgeon and philosopher in Ancient Rome. Other Galens include:

People
 Galen Bodenhausen (born 1961), American social psychologist
 Galen A. Carter (1832–1893), American politician
 Galen Cisco (born 1936), American former Major League Baseball pitcher
 Galen Clark (1814–1910), first European American to discover the Mariposa Grove of Giant Sequoia trees and conservationist
 Galen Cole (1925–2020), American philanthropist
 Galen Cranz, American professor of architecture
 Galen Dreibelbis (born 1935), American politician
 Galen Gering (born 1971), American actor
 Galen Hadley (born 1942), American politician
 Galen Hall (born 1940),  American retired college and professional football coach and player
 Galen Higdon (born 1954), American politician
 Galen Hollenbaugh, American politician
 Galen Laack (1931–1958), American football player
 Galen Rowell (1940–2002), American wilderness photographer, adventure photojournalist and climber
 Galen Rupp (born 1986), American long-distance runner
 Galen Seaman (1837–1932), American lawyer and politician
 Galen L. Stone (1862–1926), American financier and philanthropist
 Galen L. Stone (diplomat) (1921–2018), American diplomat, Ambassador to Cyprus, grandson of the above
 Galen Stone (American football) (born 1988), American former football player
 Galen Strawson (born 1952), British analytic philosopher and literary critic
 Galen D. Stucky, American chemist
 Galen Weston (1940–2021), British-Canadian billionaire businessman and philanthropist
 Galen Weston Jr. (born 1972), Canadian billionaire businessman, son of the above

Fictional characters
 Galen "Doc" Adams, in the long-running TV series Gunsmoke
 Galen DeMarco, a character in the world of Judge Dredd
 Galen Erso, in Rogue One: A Star Wars Story
 Galen Kord, in the Transformers universe
 Galen Marek, aka Starkiller, a Dark Jedi in the Star Wars: The Force Unleashed project
 Galen Tyrol, in the re-imagined TV series Battlestar Galactica
 Galen, a character in Crusade
 Galen, Dr. Zaius' assistant in the Planet of the Apes TV series

Masculine given names